Zaï or Tassa is a farming technique to dig pits (20-30 cm long and deep and 90 cm apart) in the soil during the preseason to catch water and concentrate compost. The technique is traditionally used in western Sahel (Burkina Faso, Niger, Mali) to restore degraded drylands and increase soil fertility.

Zaï holes were reintroduced since the 1980s by Yacouba Sawadogo, a farmer from Burkina Faso, who introduced the innovation of filling them with manure and compost to provide plant nutrients. The manure attracts termites, whose tunnels help further break up the soil. He also slightly increased the size of the holes over the traditional models. Zaï holes help by improving the yields of trees, sorghum, and millet by up to 500 percent.

As an alternative to the zaï-technique some agricultural engineers suggest a diking technique, especially in the case of very light soils.

See also
Farmer-managed Natural Regeneration (FMNR)
Regenerative Agriculture
Hugelkultur

References

Alwar district
Articles containing video clips